José Fernando Gomes Tavares (born 23 April 1966) is a Portuguese former footballer who played mainly as a central midfielder. He is currently the head coach of Crown Legacy FC in MLS Next Pro.

Club career
Tavares was born in Vila Nova de Gaia, Porto District. During his career he played for C.F. Oliveira do Douro, F.C. Infesta, FC Porto, Boavista FC, S.L. Benfica (after an unsuccessful season, he returned to Boavista) and U.D. Leiria.

Tavares retired in 2003 at the age of 37 after a second spell with Infesta, amassing Primeira Liga totals of 185 games and 14 goals over the course of nine seasons.

International career
With the Portugal national team, Tavares was in the squad that participated in the UEFA Euro 1996 tournament, and earned a total of eight caps.

References

External links

1966 births
Living people
Sportspeople from Vila Nova de Gaia
Portuguese footballers
Association football midfielders
Primeira Liga players
Liga Portugal 2 players
Segunda Divisão players
FC Porto players
Boavista F.C. players
S.L. Benfica footballers
U.D. Leiria players
Portugal international footballers
UEFA Euro 1996 players
Charlotte FC non-playing staff
FC Porto B managers